The Glorious Frontiers Party  (taken from the first line of Ey Iran anthem) is an Iranian nationalist political party exiled in the United States. The party is banned in Iran.

According to Radio Free Europe/Radio Liberty, "Marz-e Por-Gohar was established in Tehran by a group of nationalist secular writers and journalists in 1998, but now some of them live in Los Angeles".
Roozbeh Farahanipour, the party's leader and twelve other members were arrested in Iran student protests, July 1999.

References

External links
Official Website

Banned political parties in Iran
Secularism in Iran
Nationalist parties in Asia
Political parties established in 1998